Güttersbach may refer to:

 Güttersbach (Crumbach), a river of Hesse, Germany, tributary of the Crumbach
 Güttersbach (Mossautal), a constituent community of Mossautal, Hesse, Germany